Ram Shanker Vijaya Mogan (born 17 June 1985 in Singapore) is a Singaporean footballer who plays for Balestier Khalsa Football Club. His short stint with the Young Lions only spanned a handful of substitute appearances in the S.League.

References

1985 births
Living people
Singaporean people of Tamil descent
Singaporean sportspeople of Indian descent
Singaporean footballers
Association football midfielders
Young Lions FC players
Balestier Khalsa FC players
Singapore Premier League players